Wintour may refer to

Places
Wintour's Leap, a rock climbing location in Gloucestershire, England
Mount Wintour in Canada

Surname
 Dame Anna Wintour (born 1949), the editor-in-chief of American Vogue
Anna Wintour (song) by Azealia Banks
Anna Wintour Costume Center, a wing of the Metropolitan Museum of Art in New York, U.S.
 Charles Wintour (1917–1999), British publisher, father of Anna and Patrick
 Cordelia Mary Wintour, British educator and magistrate, sister of Charles
 Dave Wintour, British bass guitarist
 Fitzgerald Wintour, British military officer, father of Charles
 John Wintour (disambiguation), multiple people
 Marelyn Wintour-Coghlan, Australian physiologist
 Patrick Wintour (born 1954), political editor of The Guardian, son of Charles, brother of Anna
 Robert and Thomas Wintour, two of the leading members of the 1605 Gunpowder Plot
 Wintour baronets

Other
 The Wintour Vestments made by recusant Catholic seamstress Helena Wintour 
 Wintour is Coming, a concert tour by American rock band Fall Out Boy